Group Nine Media was an American digital media holding company based in New York City. The company comprises  Thrillist, NowThis, The Dodo, and Seeker. The four brands, and former brand Sourcefed, merged to form Group Nine Media in October 2016. In October 2019, Group Nine Media acquired PopSugar. In December 2020, Group Nine formed its own corporate SPAC to use the public funding for the purpose of effecting a merger, capital stock exchange, asset acquisition, stock purchase, reorganization or similar business combination. In December 2021, Vox Media announced its intention to acquire Group Nine. The transaction was completed in February 2022, and Group Nine was folded into Vox Media.

Ownership 
At the time of the 2016 merger, Discovery Communications announced a $100 million minority investment in the collective organization, becoming the biggest shareholder before Axel Springer. Discovery also acquired the right to obtain a majority stake later if it so chooses. In 2017, Discovery led a $40 million funding round in the digital media company. Group Nine Media raised $50 million in new funding in 2019, led by its lead investor Discovery along with participation from German publishing firm Axel Springer.

Ben Lerer, founder of Thrillist and managing director of Lerer Hippeau Ventures, serves as CEO of Group Nine Media.

On 13 December 2021, it was announced that Vox Media would acquire Group Nine Media. The acquisition was completed on 22 February 2022.

References

External links 
 

Vox Media
Holding companies based in New York City
Mass media companies based in New York City
2016 establishments in New York City
Mass media companies established in 2016
American companies established in 2016
Former Warner Bros. Discovery subsidiaries
2022 mergers and acquisitions